Pamela T. Greenwood is the former presiding judge of the Utah Court of Appeals and was a pioneer woman lawyer in the state of Utah.

Early life and education
Pamela Greenwood attended the University of Utah, graduating with a bachelor's degree in music. She obtained her law degree from the University of Utah College of Law in 1972 where she was a member of the Utah Law Review and elected to the Bar & Gavel Society. She was an associate professor at the law school from 1972–1977.

Legal career

During the years between her admission to the bar in 1972 and appointment to the court, she practiced general civil law in the areas of real estate, corporate law, employment, domestic law, and bankruptcy. From 1976 to 1977, she worked at the Salt Lake City law firm of Roe and Fowler. From 1977 to 1980, she was counsel to the Utah State Bar and became the first woman president of both the Salt Lake County Bar and the Utah State Bar. She was also general counsel and vice president at First Interstate Bank of Utah for seven years.

Judge Greenwood served as interim Utah state court administrator in 1995, while still attending to and fulling her responsibilities on the Court of Appeals. She has served on numerous committees of both the Bar and the courts and was presiding judge for the Court of Appeals for two separate terms.

Judge Greenwood has served as an arbitrator for the Bar's fee dispute arbitration program and completed an Arbitration Training Institute sponsored by the American Bar Association Section of Dispute Resolution.

Judicial career
Judge Greenwood was appointed by Gov. Norman H. Bangerter in January 1987. Judge Greenwood joined the Court of Appeals, at its formation. She was certified by the Utah Judicial Council for retention in the 2008 General Election and was retained in office.  She retired on December 31, 2009.

Selected cases

Miller v. State
Harry Miller was accused of robbing an elderly woman at knifepoint at a Salt Lake City, Utah convenience store on December 8 of 2000. When the elderly woman was shown a picture of Miller in 2003, she identified him as her attacker. Miller testified of his innocence and insisted that it couldn't have possibly been him because he had suffered from a stroke in Louisiana only days before and had been bedridden at the time of the attack. Miller's testimony was dismissed on the account that he was the only witness and was convicted of the crime.

Miller appealed his conviction to the Court of Appeals. During this process, new attorneys found evidence that supported Miller's alibi - a testimony from his niece and medical records from a nurse who cared for him following his stroke. These records were dated before and after the aggravated robbery held in Salt Lake City. In response to this new evidence, Judge Pamela Greenwood wrote in a conclusion of the court's decision, "Because we determine that Miller's petition presents a 'bona fide issue as to whether (he) is factually innocent of the charges of which (he) was convicted,' we reverse and remand for a hearing to determine Miller's factual innocence."

STATE v. C.K. and S.K., Appellees.
On June 13, 1995, the six children of a divorced woman, referred to as S.K., were removed from her home after allegations of physical abuse and head lice infestation. The children were returned home after two months under Family Preservation and Protective Supervision Services from the Department of Child and Family Services (DCFS).

On July 1, 1996, the children were once again removed from the home after one of the children phoned the police. The child reported that he and the other children were hungry because their mother had locked up the food. Indeed, upon inspecting the home, investigators found locked cupboards and other evidence to support claims of physical abuse, physical and medical neglect, and emotional maltreatment.

As a result, the court awarded custody of two of the children to DCFS; the other four children were placed with relatives. DCFS issued both the mother and father of the two children separate services plans with a return-home goal. These included requirements such as undergoing psychological evaluation and maintaining a permanent, clean residence. Both the mother and father were given six months to complete these requirements to regain custody of their children. At the end of the six months, the mother was issued a new plan which incorporated individual therapy, attending anger management classes, attending parenting classes for learning-disabled children, while still maintaining a permanent, clean residence.

At the twelve-month dispositional hearing, the juvenile court found DCFS had provided appropriate services to the parents but that the parents had only partially completed the service plans. After consulting with the children's psychologist, it was decided that interaction with the parents was not beneficial for the children and that it was unsafe for the children to be returned to either parent. The court terminated all reunification services and suspended visitation rights.

That same day, the State filed a petition on behalf of the children to terminate parental rights of both parents. The petition alleged that (1) the parents had abused the children, (2) the parents were unfit or incompetent, (3) the parents did not remedy the circumstances leading to the children's removal, (4) the parents failed to make adjustments required to allow return of the children, (5) the parents only made token efforts toward retaining their parental rights, and (6) the children's best interests favored adoption by other parents.

Upon review of evidence supporting the idea that the parents were unfit to care for these children, it was found that while the mother had indeed failed to make the necessary changes in order to regain her children, the father had put forth tremendous effort. The children would often ask to visit their father, while no such requests were made for their mother. Seeing that the father was not living at the home when the abuse took place, and that he had complied to his service plan in a genuine effort to change the situation.

As a result, the court dismissed the State's appeal to terminate the mother and father's parental rights, and custody was given to the father and his wife. "[However,] the State has failed to prove by clear and convincing evidence, especially in light of the conclusions reached with respect to the father, that it would be in the best interests of the children for her rights to be terminated. While she may not be able to act as the custodial parent for the children, her continued involvement in their life as a mother divorced from their father may yet be important to their well-being." The mother was given limited visitation.

Awards and accomplishments

The Women Lawyers of Utah named Judge Greenwood as the Woman Lawyer of the Year in 1993 and the Bar honored her with a Special Service Award in 1996. She also received the Dorathy Merrill Brothers Award for the advancement of women in the legal profession in 2002 and a Distinguished Judicial Service Award in 2010 from the Bar. In 2011 Judge Greenwood received a Lifetime Service award from the Utah State Bar.

Judge Greenwood is currently a member of the Women Lawyers of Utah, the Utah chapter of the Fellows of the American Bar Foundation, the American Inns of Court, and the S.J. Quinney College of Law Board of Trustees. Judge Greenwood also served as vice chair of the Utah Judicial Council from 1992 to 1998. She was acting State Court administrator from January 1995 to September 1995.

External links
 Official website of the Utah Court of Appeals

References

Year of birth missing (living people)
Living people
S.J. Quinney College of Law alumni
University of Utah faculty
Utah lawyers
Utah state court judges
American women judges
American women lawyers
American women academics
21st-century American women